Wexham School is a co-educational community school in Wexham Court, Slough, Berkshire.

Admissions
The school opened in 1987, and serves students aged 11–18, with a sixth form created in 2006.

In November 2017, the school was judged good in all categories by Ofsted and they said “the school’s work to promote pupils’ personal development and welfare is outstanding”.

References

External links
School Website

Secondary schools in Slough
Educational institutions established in 1987
1987 establishments in England
Community schools in Slough